Wim de Decker (born 6 April 1982 in Temse) is a retired Belgian football player and manager, who is currently managing Beveren in the Belgian First Division B. In 2006, De Decker played one match for the Belgium national football team, a friendly against Saudi Arabia.

International career
He collected two caps with the Belgium national team.

Honours
Beerschot A.C
Belgian Cup: 2005

References

1982 births
Living people
People from Temse
Belgian footballers
Belgium international footballers
K.R.C. Genk players
Beerschot A.C. players
K.A.A. Gent players
K.S.K. Beveren players
Royal Antwerp F.C. players
Belgian Pro League players
Challenger Pro League players
Royal Antwerp F.C. managers
K.A.A. Gent managers
Association football midfielders
Belgian football managers
Belgian First Division B managers
Footballers from East Flanders